Albanian Supercup 1994 is the fifth edition of the Albanian Supercup since its establishment in 1989. The match was contested between the Albanian Cup 1994 winners KF Tirana and the 1993–94 Albanian Superliga champions Teuta.

Match details

See also
 1993–94 Albanian Superliga
 1993–94 Albanian Cup

References

1994
Supercup
Albanian Supercup, 1994
Albanian Supercup, 1994